Milićević may refer to:

Branko Milićević (born 1946), Serbian actor popular for his roles in children's TV shows
Danijel Milićević (born 1986), Bosnian footballer
Dejan Milićević, Macedonian-born Serbian music video director and fashion photographer
Ksenia Milicevic (born 1942), French painter, architect and town planner
Milan Đ. Milićević (1831–1908), Serbian writer of the Romanticism period
Ognjenka Milićević (1927–2008), Serbian director, acting professor, and theatre expert

See also
 Miličević
 Milić

Serbian surnames
Croatian surnames